Permeability in fluid mechanics and the Earth sciences (commonly symbolized as k) is a measure of the ability of a porous material (often, a rock or an unconsolidated material) to allow fluids to pass through it.

Permeability
Permeability is a property of porous materials that is an indication of the ability for fluids (gas or liquid) to flow through them. Fluids can more easily flow through a material with high permeability than one with low permeability. The permeability of a medium is related to the porosity, but also to the shapes of the pores in the medium and their level of connectedness. Fluid flows can also be influenced in different lithological settings by brittle deformation of rocks in fault zones; the mechanisms by which this occurs are the subject of fault zone hydrogeology. Permeability is also affected by the pressure inside a material.

Units 
The SI unit for permeability is m2. A practical unit for permeability is the Darcy (d), or more commonly the millidarcy (md) (1 Darcy  10−12 m2). The name honors the French Engineer Henry Darcy who first described the flow of water through sand filters for potable water supply. Permeability values for most materials commonly range typically from a fraction to several thousand millidarcies. The unit of cm2 is also sometimes used (1 cm2 = 10−4 m2  108 d).

Applications 

The concept of permeability is of importance in determining the flow characteristics of hydrocarbons in oil and gas reservoirs, and of groundwater in aquifers.

For a rock to be considered as an exploitable hydrocarbon reservoir without stimulation, its permeability must be greater than approximately 100 md (depending on the nature of the hydrocarbon – gas reservoirs with lower permeabilities are still exploitable because of the lower viscosity of gas with respect to oil).  Rocks with permeabilities significantly lower than 100 md can form efficient seals (see petroleum geology).  Unconsolidated sands may have permeabilities of over 5000 md.

The concept also has many practical applications outside of geology, for example in chemical engineering (e.g., filtration), as well as in Civil Engineering when determining whether the ground conditions of a site are suitable for construction.

Description 
Permeability is part of the proportionality constant in Darcy's law which relates discharge (flow rate) and fluid physical properties (e.g. viscosity), to a pressure gradient applied to the porous media:

 (for linear flow)

Therefore:
 

where:
 is the fluid velocity through the porous medium (i.e., the average flow velocity calculated as if the fluid was the only phase present in the porous medium) (m/s)
 is the permeability of a medium (m2)
 is the dynamic viscosity of the fluid (Pa·s)
 is the applied pressure difference (Pa)
 is the thickness of the bed of the porous medium (m)

In naturally occurring materials, the permeability values range over many orders of magnitude (see table below for an example of this range).

Relation to hydraulic conductivity 
The global proportionality constant for the flow of water through a porous medium is called the hydraulic conductivity (unit: m/s). Permeability, or intrinsic permeability, (unit: m2) is a part of this, and is a specific property characteristic of the solid skeleton and the microstructure of the porous medium itself, independently of the nature and properties of the fluid flowing through the pores of the medium. This allows to take into account the effect of temperature on the viscosity of the fluid flowing though the porous medium and to address other fluids than pure water, e.g., concentrated brines, petroleum, or organic solvents. Given the value of hydraulic conductivity for a studied system, the permeability can be calculated as follows:

where
  is the permeability, m2
  is the hydraulic conductivity, m/s
  is the dynamic viscosity of the fluid, Pa·s
  is the density of the fluid, kg/m3
  is the acceleration due to gravity, m/s2.

Anisotropic permeability 
Tissue such as brain, liver, muscle, etc can be treated as a heterogeneous porous medium. Describing the flow of biofluids (blood, cerebrospinal fluid, etc.) within such a medium requires a full 3-dimensional anisotropic treatment of the tissue.  In this case the scalar hydraulic permeability is replaced with the hydraulic permeability tensor so that Darcy's Law reads

  is the Darcy flux, or filtration velocity, which describes the bulk (not microscopic) velocity field of the fluid,  
  is the dynamic viscosity of the fluid, 
  is the hydraulic permeability tensor, 
  is the gradient operator, 
  is the pressure field in the fluid, 

Connecting this expression to the isotropic case, where k is the scalar hydraulic permeability, and 1 is the identity tensor.

Determination 
Permeability is typically determined in the lab by application of Darcy's law under steady state conditions or, more generally, by application of various solutions to the diffusion equation for unsteady flow conditions.

Permeability needs to be measured, either directly (using Darcy's law), or through estimation using empirically derived formulas.  However, for some simple models of porous media, permeability can be calculated (e.g., random close packing of identical spheres).

Permeability model based on conduit flow
Based on the Hagen–Poiseuille equation for viscous flow in a pipe, permeability can be expressed as:

where:
 is the intrinsic permeability [length2]
 is a dimensionless constant that is related to the configuration of the flow-paths
 is the average, or effective pore diameter [length].

Absolute permeability (aka intrinsic or specific permeability)
Absolute permeability denotes the permeability in a porous medium that is 100% saturated with a single-phase fluid.  This may also be called the intrinsic permeability or specific permeability.  These terms refer to the quality that the permeability value in question is an intensive property of the medium, not a spatial average of a heterogeneous block of material ; and that it is a function of the material structure only (and not of the fluid). They explicitly distinguish the value from that of relative permeability.

Permeability to gases
Sometimes permeability to gases can be somewhat different than those for liquids in the same media. One difference is attributable to "slippage" of gas at the interface with the solid when the gas mean free path is comparable to the pore size (about 0.01 to 0.1 μm at standard temperature and pressure). See also Knudsen diffusion and constrictivity. For example, measurement of permeability through sandstones and shales yielded values from 9.0×10−19 m2 to 2.4×10−12 m2 for water and between 1.7×10−17 m2 to 2.6×10−12 m2 for nitrogen gas. Gas permeability of reservoir rock and source rock is important in petroleum engineering, when considering the optimal extraction of gas from unconventional sources such as shale gas, tight gas, or coalbed methane.

Permeability tensor  
To model permeability in anisotropic media, a permeability tensor is needed. Pressure can be applied in three directions, and for each direction, permeability can be measured (via Darcy's law in 3D) in three directions, thus leading to a 3 by 3 tensor. The tensor is realised using a 3 by 3 matrix being both symmetric and positive definite (SPD matrix):
 The tensor is symmetric by the Onsager reciprocal relations.
 The tensor is positive definite because the energy being expended (the inner product of fluid flow and negative pressure gradient) is always positive.

The permeability tensor is always diagonalizable (being both symmetric and positive definite). The eigenvectors will yield the principal directions of flow where flow is parallel to the pressure gradient, and the eigenvalues represent the principal permeabilities.

Ranges of common intrinsic permeabilities
These values do not depend on the fluid properties; see the table derived from the same source for values of hydraulic conductivity, which are specific to the material through which the fluid is flowing.

See also
 Fault zone hydrogeology
 Hydraulic conductivity
 Hydrogeology
 Permeation
 Petroleum geology
 Relative permeability
 Klinkenberg correction
 Electrical resistivity measurement of concrete

Footnotes

References
 Wang, H. F., 2000. Theory of Linear Poroelasticity with Applications to Geomechanics and Hydrogeology, Princeton University Press.

External links
 Defining Permeability 
 Tailoring porous media to control permeability
 Permeability of Porous Media
 Graphical depiction of different flow rates through materials of differing permeability
 Web-based porosity and permeability calculator given flow characteristics
 Multiphase fluid flow in porous media
 Florida Method of Test For Concrete Resistivity as an Electrical Indicator of its Permeability

Aquifers
Hydrology
Soil mechanics
Soil physics
Porous media
In situ geotechnical investigations